Several vessels have been named Macclesfield for Macclesfield, or the Earl of Macclesfield:

  was a galley or "frigate" that the British East India Company (EIC) hired in 1699. She made two voyages for the EIC, the first to China (Canton), and the second to Bombay. 
  was launched in October 1720 on the River Thames. She made four voyages for the British East India Company (EIC) before she was sold in 1732.
 Macclesfield was a hired armed ship that served the Royal Navy between 1756 and 1758. 
  was launched at Lancaster in 1803. She made three voyages as a slave ship in the triangular trade in enslaved people. After the end of British participation in the trans-Atlantic slave trade she became a West Indiaman. She was wrecked in 1809.

or

Ship names
Royal Navy ship names